Sergey Aleksandrovich Shelmenko (born 5 April 1983) is a former Russian handball player who played the Ukraine national team and Russian national team.

References

1983 births
Living people
Ukrainian male handball players
Russian male handball players
Sportspeople from Kyiv
Expatriate handball players
HC Motor Zaporizhia players
Rhein-Neckar Löwen players
ZTR players